Chevron Hall of Stars is an American television anthology series which aired in 1956 in 
first-run syndication.  It was produced by Four Star Productions, and was a half-hour series. 

Gene Roddenberry’s script The Secret Weapon of 117 was broadcast on the series on March 6, 1956. Another 1956 episode was an unsuccessful pilot for a Captain Kidd TV series. It featured Anthony Dexter in the title role, Denton De Gray as Scar, Danny Green as Morgan, and Christopher Lee as the governor.

The November 22, 1956, episode, "Double Cross", featured Don Taylor as detective Richard Diamond.

Warren Lewis was the producer.

Notable guest stars
Gene Barry
Lloyd Bridges
Raymond Burr
Dane Clark
Charles Coburn
Noreen Corcoran
Angie Dickinson
Sally Fraser
Beverly Garland
Phyllis Kirk
Angela Lansbury
Joan Leslie
John Litel
Thomas Mitchell
Ricardo Montalban
Maureen O'Sullivan
Richard Reeves
Cesar Romero
Lee Van Cleef
James Whitmore
Alan Young

See also
The Star and the Story – another "Four Star Productions" anthology series which aired in first-runs syndication.

References

External links
Chevron Hall of Stars at CVTA with episode list
 Chevron Hall of Stars on IMDb

1956 American television series debuts
1956 American television series endings
1950s American anthology television series
Black-and-white American television shows
First-run syndicated television programs in the United States